Ebelingia is a genus of Asian crab spiders consisting of two species separated from Mecaphesa due to their distinct abdominal pattern and the unique color pattern of their body and legs.  it contains three species found throughout Asia: E. forcipata, E. hubeiensis and E. kumadai.

See also
 List of Thomisidae species

References

Further reading

Araneomorphae genera
Spiders of Asia
Taxa named by Pekka T. Lehtinen
Thomisidae